Absolute Quiet is a 1936 American drama film directed by George B. Seitz and written by Harry Clork. The film stars Lionel Atwill, Irene Hervey, Raymond Walburn, Stuart Erwin, Ann Loring and Louis Hayward. A Metro-Goldwyn-Mayer picture, it was released on April 24, 1936, and distributed by Loew's Inc.

Plot
                                                                                                                                                
 "Businessman Gerald Axton goes to his ranch to rest, having had a near-heart-attack due to business worries. But while there (with his female assistant who makes his heart flutter as much as his business worries), a pair of escaped criminals crashes the party, as well as a plane load of passengers who literally crash in. Coincidentally, the plane was carrying the state's governor, whom Axton was at odds with, Axton's ex-paramour and her lover, whom Axton was sending away under false pretenses, and a reporter willing to write up all the sordid details".
                                                                                                                           - Ron Kerrigan

Cast 
Lionel Atwill as G.A. Axton
Irene Hervey as Laura Tait
Raymond Walburn as Governor Pruden
Stuart Erwin as 'Chubby' Rudd
Ann Loring as Zelda Tadema
Louis Hayward as Gregory Bengard
Wallace Ford as Jack
Bernadene Hayes as Judy
Robert Gleckler as Jasper Cowdray		
Harvey Stephens as Barney Tait
J. Carrol Naish as Pedro
Matt Moore as Pilot
Robert Livingston as Co-Pilot

References

External links 
 

1936 films
American drama films
1936 drama films
Metro-Goldwyn-Mayer films
Films scored by Franz Waxman
Films directed by George B. Seitz
American black-and-white films
American aviation films
1930s English-language films
1930s American films